TheFormTool is document assembly software (also known as document automation or forms creation). TheFormTool operates within Microsoft Word for Windows.

TheFormTool inserts a grid placed at the end and into a Word template to gather answers that is used to assemble each final document. A form's Author creates Questions in the template and determines the effects of their Answers by using the software's tools. TheFormTool enables a form author to create a Word template that gets automatically assembled based on the answers given by form Users.

TheFormTool allows document Authors to create intelligent forms and obtains document assembly via a simple, menu-driven interface, using point-and-click commands.  The commands allow document assembly to be created without having to learn or type any code.  The software can deploy lists, conditions, computations, repetitions, insertions, language assembly, as well as embedded rules for grammar and syntax. Form Users provide answers to the questions and then the TheFormTool automatically assembles the completed document. 

A form created with TheFormTool is a MS Word document that can be edited, saved, shared and managed just as any other Word document or template. According to Eric Zaidins, the  typical user of this "remarkable software" can "be creating basic forms in minutes" at a fraction of the cost of some alternatives.  Data captured by TheFormTool PRO can be stored in an XML file and is available for later reuse. According to the American Bar Association's Law Practice Today, TheFormTool "allow(s) a lawyer to set up a document that can be auto-filled with absolutely no programming skills."  According to the editors of CNET, "It's one of the most capable Word add-ins we've tried, and one that adds the most to Word's already considerable capabilities.

While originally directed to lawyers, TheFormTool "is useful in the creation and distribution of any document ranging from sales pitches and other form letters to thank-you notes to friends and relatives."  According to Accounting Today, "The software can be used in audit reports, asset purchase agreements, appraisals, assessments, bankruptcy filings, bids, contracts, complaints, compliance certificates, evaluations, fee agreements, interview summaries, leases, mortgages, patient intake, history and evaluation, pleadings, reports of all kinds, statements of work, and other types of documents."

History 
TheFormTool was developed in 2011 by Snapdone, Inc. of Vashon, Washington, and first publicly introduced at a regional meeting of NALS, the national association of legal professionals, in June of that year.  A month later, Scott Campbell, TheFormTool's developer, demonstrated it at the Washington State Bar Association's 2011 Solo and Small Firm Conference.

In September 2011, Snapdone and Your Dollar Matters, Inc. created a joint venture to market TheFormTool to law firms in the United States. TheFormTool and TheFormTool PRO were first distributed generally in the United States in December 2011, and its first international delivery was in Hobart, Tasmania, Australia in January 2012. A significant percentage of commercial (non-law) customers use TheFormTool to create an array of forms: estimates, bids, RFPs, SOWs and bills of materials, among other uses.

Products 
An unrestricted lifetime license is included with the free version of TheFormTool. The free version allows a form Author to call for, and a User to supply, text, numbers, or dates that TheFormTool software can then use to automatically complete a form. Each individual use of an Answer within a form can be formatted separately. Date offsets into the past and future can be computed from the date supplied as an Answer, taking into account workdays, holidays, weeks, months and years.

TheFormTool PRO provides additional features and functions that enable a document to mimic an Author's complex reasoning using conditional decisioning, derived answers, nested logic operators, two dozen math functions, pronoun, singular/plural and count fields, lists, master lists, and choices to construct a document customized for its circumstances. TheFormTool PRO supports shared data and templates and network operations.

Developments 
In February 2013, TheFormTool PRO v2.4 was distributed to owners of TheFormTool PRO as a free update. TheFormTool PRO v2.4 is more than six times as fast as previous versions.

In February 2013, Your Dollar Matters, Inc. spun off its sponsorship and marketing of TheFormTool to a subsidiary, TheFormTool, LLC.

Awards 
TheFormTool awarded a “Spectacular” 5-star rating by CNET (2/2012)

TheFormTool PRO awarded an “A” TechnoScore in TechnoLawyer's SmallLaw (7/2012)

TheFormTool PRO selected as a “Top 10 Product of 2012” by TechnoLawyer (#4) (12/2012)

See also 
Document Assembly

Document Automation

Intelligent Document

External links 
 TheFormTool

References

Business software